Kaechon concentration camp (also spelled Kaech'ŏn or Gaecheon) is a prison in North Korea with many political prisoners. The official name is Kyo-hwa-so (Reeducation camp) No. 1.

Location

The camp is located in Kae'chŏn county, P'yŏngan-namdo province in North Korea.

Description
Kaechon concentration camp is a large prison compound, around 300 m (1000 feet) long and 300 m (1000 feet) wide, surrounded by a 4 m (13 feet) high wall with barbed wire on top. The prisoners, around 4000 men and 2000 women (in 1992), are political prisoners mixed with common criminals. Theoretically prisoners should be released after reeducation through labor and serving their sentence. But as the prison sentences are very long and the conditions are extremely harsh, many do not survive their prison sentences. Ji Hae-nam estimates that during her sentence of two years around 20% of the prisoners died.

Purpose
The main purpose of Kaechon camp is to punish people for less-serious crimes, whereas political crimes (e. g. criticism of the government) are considered a severe offense. But the prisoners are also used as slave workers, who have to fulfill high production quotas in very difficult conditions. For this purpose there is a shoe making factory, a leather and rubber factory, a clothing factory and other factories in the camp.

Human rights situation
The human rights situation in the camp is described in detail by Lee Soon-ok in her testimony to the United States Senate Committee on the Judiciary. She explains how the prisoners have no rights and how they are treated at the mercy of the guards.

Forced labour
The prisoners are forced to work around 18 hours per day at the camp's factories. If someone does not work quickly enough, he or she is beaten. Sometimes prisoners sleep at their workplaces to fulfill the production quota. All this involves frequent work accidents and many prisoners are crippled from the work or from torture.

Health and sanitation
Prisoners are forced to sleep in a room with 80 to 90 people in 30 square metre (322 square feet) flea-infested rooms. Prisoners are only occasionally allowed to use the toilet (one for about 300 people) and may only take a shower after several months. Diseases like paratyphus are common, resulting from the bad nutrition.

Malnutrition
Food rations are 100 grams of broken corn three times a day and a salt soup. In case of rule violations food rations are reduced. Lee Soon-ok reported that prisoners even killed rats and ate them raw in order to survive.

Torture
There are 78 punishment cells in the camp, each 60 cm (24 inches) wide and 110 cm (43 inches) high, where prisoners are locked up several days. Afterwards many of them are unable to walk and some even die. Prisoners are often beaten, kicked or whipped. Lee Soon-ok was tortured being forced to drink a large quantity of water until she fainted (water torture) and almost died. During her sentence she witnessed many types of torture.

Homicides and Infanticides
Pregnant women are forced to have abortions by injections. Lee Soon-ok witnessed babies born alive being murdered directly after birth.

Executions
As with all the prison camps, public executions are commonplace and usually done in front of all of the prisoners.

Prisoners (witnesses)
 Lee Soon-ok (1987–1992 in Kaechon) was imprisoned on alleged embezzlement of state property, when she refused to put material on the side for her superior. She was sentenced to 13 years in a prison camp, but released earlier under a surprise amnesty.
 Ji Hae-nam (1993–1995 in Kaechon) was imprisoned on disruption of the socialist order, as she sang a South Korean pop song and was denounced by a neighbor. She was sentenced to 3 years in a prison camp, but released after 2 years and 2 months.

See also
 Human rights in North Korea 
 Prisons in North Korea 
 Yodok concentration camp
 Kaechon internment camp
 Lee Soon Ok
 Eyes of the Tailless Animals: Prison Memoirs of a North Korean Woman

External links
 United States Senate Hearings: Testimony of Ms. Soon Ok Lee – Lee Soon-oks testimony to the US Senate Judiciary Committee June 21, 2002
 Committee for Human Rights in North Korea – Overview on North Korean Prison Camps with Testimonies and Satellite Photographs
 Daily NK: North Korean crimes against humanity – Collection of testimonies
 Witness reveals horror of North Korean gulag - Report on prison camps, The Guardian, July 19, 2002
 A survivor: Soon Ok Lee – 7 years of torture in N. Korean prison camp – Report on Lee Soon-Ok, MSNBC, October 28, 2003
 Satellite imagery and witness accounts of North Korean political prison and reeducation camps

Bibliography
Lee, Soon Ok. Eyes of the Tailless Animals: Prison Memoirs of a North Korean Woman. Living Sacrifice Book Co, 1999,

References

Concentration camps in North Korea